Railway stations in Venezuela include:

Cities with Rapid Transit
City with underground railway system:
 Caracas (El Metro de Caracas, operated by C.A. Metro de Caracas)
 Los Teques Metro - opened in 2006.

Stations

Closed 
 Camoruco
 El Encanto

Existing 
 Puerto Cabello
 San Felipe (Yaracuy state)
 Barquisimeto - terminus
 Caracas
 Cúa - opened 2006
 Ciudad Guayana port for mining railways

Under Construction 
 San Juan de los Morros
 San Fernando de Apure
 Chaguaramas
 Cabruta

Proposed 
 Tinaco
 El Pao
 Ortiz, Venezuela
 Chaguaramas
 Valle de la Pascua
 state of Anzoátegui, in north-east Venezuela.

Green 
 El Piñal
 Barquisimeto
 Carora
 La Ceiba
 El Vigía
 La Fría aka La Fria
 Encontrados
 Machiques
 Maracaibo
 Puerto Las Américas - terminus

Purple 
 Punto Fijo - terminus
 Coro
 Yaracal
 Tucacas
 Morón, Venezuela
 Puerto Cabello

Brown 
 El Baul, Cojedes

See also 
 East-West Railway, Venezuela
 Instituto Autónomo de Ferrocarriles del Estado
 Transport in Venezuela
 Transcontinental railroad

References

External links 
 Index Mundi: Venezuela Railways
 Factories
 La Guaira and Caracas Railway (1883–1951)
 Rail in Venezuela
 Tramways in Caracas

Maps 
 UNHCR Altas Map
 UNHCR Atlas Map
 Encarta

Venezuela
Railway stations
Railway stations
Venezuela